Sweetwater Reservoir is a  artificial lake in San Diego County, California, formed by the Sweetwater Dam on the Sweetwater River. Construction of the dam was completed in 1888.

Environment
The area surrounding the reservoir is home to several species, including least Bell's vireo and the California gnatcatcher. It lies near the census-designated places of Bonita, La Presa and Spring Valley.

See also
 List of dams and reservoirs in California
 List of lakes in California

References

Reservoirs in San Diego County, California
Reservoirs in California
Reservoirs in Southern California

de:Lower Otay und Sweetwater